Michelle Struijk (born 24 June 1998) is a Belgian field hockey player for the Belgian national team.

She participated at the 2018 Women's Hockey World Cup.

References

External links 
 

1998 births
Living people
Belgian female field hockey players
Female field hockey forwards
Female field hockey midfielders